Kim Kyung-Ok is a South Korean judoka who competes in the women's 52 kg category. At the 2008 Summer Olympics, she finished in 5th place.  At the 2012 Summer Olympics, she was defeated in the second round by Priscilla Gneto, who then also defeated her in the repechage round.

References

External links
 

Living people
Olympic judoka of South Korea
Judoka at the 2008 Summer Olympics
Judoka at the 2012 Summer Olympics
Judoka at the 2006 Asian Games
Judoka at the 2010 Asian Games
1983 births
South Korean female judoka
Asian Games competitors for South Korea
21st-century South Korean women